Typhoon Jelawat, known in the Philippines as Typhoon Lawin, was the most intense tropical cyclone of the 2012 Pacific typhoon season in terms of ten-minute maximum sustained winds, tied with Typhoon Sanba. Following Bolaven and Sanba, Jelawat was the third typhoon directly hitting Okinawa Island in 2012. Jelawat, which means carp in Malaysian, is a type of freshwater fish.

Jelawat reached peak intensity late on September 24 and maintained it for nearly two days. The typhoon passed through Okinawa Prefecture on September 29 and finally made landfall over Aichi Prefecture in Japan on September 30. Jelawat was the strongest typhoon for Okinawa Island in 2012 by observed winds, as it also killed 2 people in Japan.

Meteorological history

Late on September 17, a tropical disturbance formed east of Guam, and the Joint Typhoon Warning Center (JTWC) issued a Tropical Cyclone Formation Alert on the system in the next two days, shortly before the Japan Meteorological Agency (JMA) upgraded the low-pressure area to a tropical depression early on September 20. Several hours later on September 20, the Philippine Atmospheric, Geophysical and Astronomical Services Administration (PAGASA) upgraded the system to a tropical depression named Lawin, before JTWC also upgraded it to a tropical depression due to low vertical wind shear and improved equatorward outflow. Soon, JMA upgraded the system to a tropical storm and named it Jelawat, so did JTWC.

Since September 21, Jelawat moved southwestwards slowly by tracking along the southwestern extension of the subtropical ridge anchoring east of Japan. Despite favourable conditions, the storm has struggled to improve its organization. When Jelawat was drifting westwards by a weak steering environment on September 22, it intensified into a severe tropical storm for excellent equatorward outflow because of speedy divergence to the south, and a tropical upper tropospheric trough cell northeast of the system started to improved its poleward outflow. Later, the system began to form an eyewall with excellent equatorward outflow and good poleward outflow.

Based on the improved organization, both JMA and JTWC upgraded Jelawat to a typhoon early on September 23, before the system began to drift northwards due to a complex steering environment resulting from a trough over East Asia and a tropical depression (later becoming Severe Tropical Storm Ewiniar) in the east. Eighteen hours later, JTWC upgraded Jelawat to a super typhoon after the system underwent explosive intensification, becoming a well-developed system with a  eye and strong spiral banding.

The typhoon also reached category 5 strength on the Saffir–Simpson hurricane wind scale, with a solid band of deep convection surrounding a  eye. Tracking northwestwards since September 25, Typhoon Jelawat entered an eyewall replacement cycle, and the process ended with a  eye on the next day.

Having maintained peak intensity for nearly two days because of excellent radial outflow enhanced by a poleward stream, Jelawat weaken slightly from late September 26 to early September 27, yet the diameter of that larger eye became . Later, the system tracked northward, for a trough over East China was eroding the subtropical ridge. When approaching Okinawa, Jelawat began to move northeastwards by tracking along the western edge of the subtropical ridge on September 28, and JTWC downgraded the system to a typhoon for a slight elongation in the overall shape. At the same time, Jelawat weakened slightly due to another eyewall replacement cycle, but radial outflow and improving poleward outflow into a deep mid-latitude shortwave trough helped the typhoon maintain intensity.

With a shrunken  pinhole eye, Typhoon Jelawat passed through the west coast of Okinawa Island early on September 29, when the estimated 10-minute maximum sustained winds were at 90 knots (165 km/h, 105 mph). Equatorward outflow has significantly hindered, as Jelawat started to gradually weaken; however, poleward outflow remained well-established and was linked to a deep mid-latitude trough directly to the north of the system. Then, the typhoon accelerated northeastwards and moved into an area of strong southwesterly vertical wind shear, but jet-induced poleward outflow kept the system from rapid decaying.

Since September 30, Jelawat was fully embedded in baroclinic zone and began extratropical transition, as the convective banding was unraveling. At 06Z, JTWC downgraded Jelawat to a tropical storm, for deep convection was sheared to the north. The system made landfall over Aichi Prefecture in Japan at 10Z, when the estimated 10-minute maximum sustained winds were at 70 knots (130 km/h, 80 mph). Eight hours later, JMA downgraded Jelawat to a severe tropical storm when it was located in Iwate Prefecture, and JTWC issued the final warning on the system 	
simultaneously. On October 1, JMA downgraded Jelawat to a tropical storm, shortly before becoming extratropical east of Kuril Islands. The extratropical cyclone strengthened and regained storm-force status on October 2, before the system crossed the International Date Line and began to weakened on October 3.

Preparations and impact

On September 29, 2012, Jelawat passed through Okinawa Prefecture.

Reports suggested that some 65 people were injured in the storm while 331,000 people remained without electricity. Strong winds flipped cars and uprooted trees. A four-ton truck was reportedly turned upside down by the winds causing a major roadblock in Naha. Flights and ferries connecting Okinawa to the rest of Japan were all cancelled. Jelawat was known locally as Typhoon Seventeen. Up to 4,200 households in the regions of Higashi and Nago was asked to evacuate immediately. Across Okinawa Prefecture, damage to agriculture amounted to ¥1.7 billion (US$21.6 million).

In Japan, preparations for the storm started early on September 30. By then, Jelawat had already injured 96 people. In Tokyo, several trains were cancelled and up to 300 flights to the city's Narita International Airport were cancelled. By October 1, one person had been killed and 140 other people were reportedly injured. Authorities in the central city of Nagoya have made it compulsory for 57,000 people to leave their homes in the wake of rising river levels in the city, which can cause significant flooding. Among the dead was a 29-year-old man who was swept away by high waves while the typhoon was passing Okinawa. In Mie Prefecture, another 2,000 people were asked to evacuate. Several other trains were cancelled and the total number of flights cancelled went up to 500.

By the night of October 1, a 56-year-old man who had been missing since the past 24 hours was confirmed dead, after he had drowned. Local news agency, NHK, reported that over 181 people were injured in the typhoon. A further 11,000 were told to evacuate in the city of Ishinomaki in the country's northeast, Jiji Press reported.

Damage in Kochi Prefecture reached ¥47 million (US$600,000). Damage in Ibaraki Prefecture reached ¥10.71 million (US$136,000). Damage in Wakayama Prefecture reached ¥403.64 million (US$5.15 million).

See also
Typhoon June (1975) - similar track
Typhoon Bolaven (2012)
Typhoon Sanba
Typhoon Phanfone (2014) - a category 4 super typhoon that approached Japan 2 years after Jelawat
Typhoon Lan

References

External links

RSMC Tokyo - Typhoon Center
Best Track Data of Typhoon Jelawat (1217) 
Best Track Data (Graphics) of Typhoon Jelawat (1217)
Best Track Data (Text)
JTWC Best Track Data of Super Typhoon 18W (Jelawat)
18W.JELAWAT from the U.S. Naval Research Laboratory
JMA General information of Typhoon Jelawat (1217) from Digital Typhoon

Typhoons in Japan
2012 Pacific typhoon season
Typhoons
Jelawat